De Wacht is a hamlet in the Dutch province of South Holland and is part of the municipality Hoeksche Waard. The village lies next to the Dordtse Kil.

De Wacht is not a statistical entity, and considered part of 's-Gravendeel. It has place name signs, and consists of about 25 houses.

References

Populated places in South Holland
Hoeksche Waard